The SAI KZ X was a light aircraft produced in Denmark for army co-operation duties in the early 1950s.

Design and development
The KZ X was a strut-braced, high-wing, two seat military observation monoplane developed from the KZ VII with a more powerful,, Continental C145 engine.

Deliveries to the Danish Army began in 1952 but by the summer of that year two had already crashed. The investigations of these crashes, attributed to failure of the wooden rudder, were conducted with technical assistance from Britain's Royal Aircraft Establishment but no underlying defect in the aircraft design was uncovered. The prototype was modified with a steel-framed rudder as the KZ X Mk.2 but the KZ X was returned to service. When two more crashes took place in 1954 the type was finally withdrawn then scrapped in 1960, leaving the prototype as the only surviving example. It is now in the Danmarks Flymuseum, active again in 2009 after restoration.

Operators

Royal Danish Army

Specifications

References

See also

 
 

1950s Danish military reconnaissance aircraft
Skandinavisk Aero Industri aircraft
Single-engined tractor aircraft
Aircraft first flown in 1951